FSE may refer to:

Organizations
 Federation of European Scouting (disambiguation)
 Ferrovie del Sud Est, an Italian railway company
 Football Supporters Europe, a football fan network
 Fung Seng Enterprises, a Hong Kong conglomerate
 Franciscan Sisters of the Eucharist, a Roman Catholic religious congregation

Computing
 Fast Software Encryption, cryptography conference
 Finite-state entropy, entropy coding scheme

Finance
 Frankfurt Stock Exchange, Germany's largest stock exchange
 Fukuoka Stock Exchange, a stock exchange in Japan

Human and veterinary medicine
 Feline spongiform encephalopathy
 Fetal scalp electrode

Science and technology
  Fast Spin Echo, a type of magnetic resonance imaging sequence
 Free surface effect, liquids in slack tanks

Other
 Finnish Sign Language (fse), the ISO languagecode for the Finnish sign language
 Fremont Street Experience, a pedestrian mall
 Field service engineer